Scandal at Scourie is a 1953 American drama Technicolor film directed by Jean Negulesco, starring Greer Garson, Walter Pidgeon "above the title", and co-starring Donna Corcoran. Garson and Pidgeon were together for the 8th and last time in this movie, which was  filmed on location in Canada.

Plot 

Catholic girl Patsy (Donna Corcoran) lives in an orphanage in Quebec. After Patsy accidentally knocks over a lamp, starting a fire that burns the orphanage down, she finds a new home with the McChesney couple, who live in Protestant Ottawa. While Victoria McChesney (Greer Garson) is excited about the new family member, Patrick McChesney (Walter Pidgeon) reacts reluctantly as he was uninformed of the adoption, and is also a candidate for the Parliament in Ottawa. After Victoria overcomes a case of mycetism caused by Patsy collecting poisonous mushrooms, Patsy is suspected of causing the flame cleaning of the local school. The examination of the case finds no concrete evidence against Patsy. McChesney declares to give up his candidature in order to accept Patsy as his daughter. Patsy, however, flees. In the meantime, her innocence is proven. Patsy is found again and accepted in the McChesney home as their daughter.

Cast 

 Greer Garson as Victoria McChesney
 Walter Pidgeon as Patrick J. McChesney
 Agnes Moorehead as Sister Josephine
 Donna Corcoran as Patsy
 Arthur Shields as Father Reilly
 Philip Ober as B. G. Belney
 Rhys Williams as Bill Swazey
 Margalo Gillmore as Alice Hanover
 John Lupton as Artemus
 Philip Tonge as Fred Gogarty
 Wilton Graff as Leffington
 Ian Wolfe as Councilman Hurdwell
 Michael Pate as Rev. Williams
 Tony Taylor as Edward
 Patricia Tiernan as Second Nun
 Victor Wood as James Motley
 Perdita Chandler as Sister Dominique
 Walter Baldwin as Michael Hayward
 Ida Moore as Mrs. Ames

Reception
According to MGM records the film earned $783,000 in the US and Canada and $842,000 elsewhere, resulting in a loss of $333,000.

Notes
Scandal at Scourie was the last of eight movies that paired Greer Garson and Walter Pidgeon. The others were:
 Blossoms in the Dust (1941)
 Mrs. Miniver (1942)
 Madame Curie (1943)
 Mrs. Parkington (1944)
 Julia Misbehaves (1948)
 That Forsyte Woman (1949)
 The Miniver Story (1950).

References

External links

 
 
 
 

1953 films
1953 drama films
American drama films
Films directed by Jean Negulesco
Films scored by Daniele Amfitheatrof
Metro-Goldwyn-Mayer films
1950s English-language films
1950s American films